The U.S. state of Kansas is divided into 1,404 townships in 105 counties.

See also
 List of counties in Kansas
 List of cities in Kansas
 List of unincorporated communities in Kansas
 List of census-designated places in Kansas
 List of ghost towns in Kansas
 Lists of places in Kansas
 Kansas locations by per capita income
 Kansas census statistical areas
 Kansas license plate county codes

External links
 United States Census Bureau 2009 TIGER/Line Shapefiles
 Census 2000 Gazetteer
 National Association of Towns and Townships

 
Townships
Kansas